Powell Industries Inc. is a manufacturer of Integrated/Packaged Solutions and Electrical Equipment to monitor and control the distribution of electrical power in commercial and industrial markets, with headquarters in Houston, Texas.

Products include Power Control Rooms, E-Houses, ANSI/IEC switchgear, MV and LV motor Control, LV switchgear, Bus Duct, Utility Transfer Switches, DC switchgear, bus duct, field services, and Power Management and Control Systems.  

Markets served by Powell include Oil and Gas Refining, Offshore Oil and Gas Production, Petrochemical, Pipelines, Terminals, Pulp and Paper, Mining, Traction Power, and Utilities.

References

External links
 http://www.powellind.com
Manufacturing companies based in Houston
Companies listed on the Nasdaq
American companies established in 1947
1947 establishments in Texas